Chesterville may refer to:

Canada
 Chesterville, Ontario
 Chesterville, Quebec

South Africa
 Chesterville, KwaZulu-Natal

United States
 Chesterville, Indiana
 Chesterville, Maine
 Chesterville, Maryland
 Chesterville, Ohio
Chesterville, Texas
Chesterville, West Virginia